Nasoor is a 1985 Hindi film directed by Ashok Chopra with Om Puri, Priya Tendulkar, Sadashiv Amrapurkar, Reema Lagoo, Achyut Potdar, KK Raina and Arun Bakshi, among others, in lead roles.

Plot
Dr Sunil Gupta, a gynaecologist and Dr. Hira are partners in Prakash Nursing Home. Sunil treats his profession as an earning job unlike his father, who landed up in debt because of treating the poor patients for free. Sunil's girlfriend Yashoda too, is a doctor working in a government hospital treating the profession as a service. A patient being treated by Dr Hira dies due to his negligence, but he saves his skin by firing the nurse. While operating on a minister's pregnant daughter-in-law, Manjula, Sunil is faced with a choice of saving either the mother or child. He opts for the former. The minister, Raosaheb, holds Sunil responsible for the child's death and lodges a complaint with the medical council. Dr Hira too sides with him against Sunil, getting him suspended. Sunil, in the meanwhile, discovers the truth of Hira's patient's death from the absconding nurse. Armed with the evidence, he files a case in the court and wins. Chastened Sunil decides to follow in his father's footsteps.

Cast
 Om Puri as Dr. Sunil Gupta 
 Priya Tendulkar as Dr. Yashoda Gore
 Sadashiv Amrapurkar as Raosaheb Mohite 
 Achyut Potdar as Dr. Hira 
 KK Raina as Kamlesh Pai 
 Arun Bakshi as Dr. Babubhai 
 Vijay Kashyap 
 Kamini Bhatia    
 Reema Lagoo as Manjula Mohite
 Shivraj as Deshpande 
 Shashi Bala

References

External links

Movies to See Before You Die

1985 films
1980s Hindi-language films